Vicki H. Grassian is a Distinguished Professor in the Department of Chemistry and Biochemistry at the University of California, San Diego. She also holds the Distinguished Chair in Physical Chemistry.

Education 
Grassian studied chemistry at the University of New York at Albany, graduating in 1981. She moved to the Rensselaer Polytechnic Institute for her master's degree, which she completed in 1982. She earned her PhD at the University of California, Berkeley in 1987. Her PhD supervisor was George C. Pimentel.

Career 
In 1990 Grassian joined the faculty of the University of Iowa, where she earned a General Electric Foundation Faculty Fellowship. She began to research the reactions between trace atmospheric gases (i.e. nitrogen oxides and volatile organic compounds) and mineral dust. She has since established herself as one of the world's leading scientists studying the environmental reactions on oxide and carbonate surfaces. She was appointed full Professor and won the Distinguished Achievement Award in 2002. There are several particles in the Earth's atmosphere, mostly consisting of mineral dust and sea spray, and their surfaces have the ability to influence the Earth's climate. She demonstrated that during the daytime, mineral dust aerosols can convert nitrogen dioxide into nitrous acid. Aerosols can be generated in volcanoes, wildfires, coal-fired power plants and vehicles.

She was named the F. Wendell Miller Chair in Chemistry and Director Nanoscience and Nanotechnology Institute in 2010. She was appointed co-director of the National Science Foundation Center for Aerosol Impacts on Chemistry of the Environment (CAICE). She was made a Fellow of the Royal Society of Chemistry in 2010 and the American Chemical Society in 2011.

From 2013-2017, Grassian was the inaugural Editor-in-Chief of Environmental Science: Nano a new journal from the Royal Society of Chemistry (RSC) Publishing and held that appointment for five years. She also served as an editor of Surface Science Reports. She won the University of Iowa Scholar of the Year Award in 2014. She mentored over 300 students in her laboratory. She became a Chartered Chemist in 2015.

In 2016 moved to the University of California San Diego. Here she leads the Grassian Research Group. Her research group focuses on the chemistry and impacts of environmental interfaces including atmospheric aerosols (mineral dust, sea spray), aqueous microdroplets, geochemical and engineered nanomaterials and indoor surfaces. They examine the applications, implications, and toxicity of metal and metal oxide nanoparticles. Her team  researches the chemistry of indoor surfaces, including the interactions of indoor gases with  components of paints (titanium dioxide), glass, concrete, and drywall. Grassian collaborates with scientists at the Scripps Hydraulics Lab to study particles generated in sea spray. By researching the properties of sea spray aerosol, such as hygroscopicity and chemical reactivity, Grassian looks to develop an understanding of our atmosphere that will help improve current climate models. In 2017 she helped identify that the bubbles that appear on the surface of breaking waves forms particulate matter that depends on molecules secreted by phytoplankton and floor dwelling bacteria for its overall composition. She gave a TEDTalk What's Really in the Air We Breathe at TEDxSan Diego in 2018.

Awards 
 2023 American Chemical Society Geochemistry Division Medal Awardee 
 2021 American Chemical Society National Award in Surface Chemistry
2021 National Science Foundation Distinguished Lecturer in Mathematical and Physical Sciences 
2020 Sustainable Nanotechnology Organization Award
 2020 American Academy of Arts and Sciences Elected Member
 2020 Iota Sigma Pi Honorary Member Award
 2019 IUPAC Distinguished Women in Chemistry or Chemical Engineering Award
 2019 William H. Nichols Medal Awardee 
 2018 American Institute of Chemists Chemical Pioneer Award
 2018 American Chemical Society Committee on Environmental Improvement Award for Incorporation of Sustainability into Chemistry Education
 2014 Royal Society of Chemistry John Jeyes Award
 2014 American Chemical Society Midwest Award
 2012 American Chemical Society Creative Advanced in Environmental Science and Technology

References 

Living people
21st-century American chemists
American women chemists
New York University alumni
University of Iowa faculty
Rensselaer Polytechnic Institute alumni
University of California, San Diego faculty
University of California, Berkeley alumni
Year of birth missing (living people)
American women academics
21st-century American women scientists